Nothing is the second EP by Diatribe, released on October 19, 1992, by Re-Constriction Records.

Music 
Recording for Nothing began after the band released Therapy in 1991 for Eight One Nine Productions and COP International. When asked about how Lee Popa and Nivek Ogre become involved with the production of Nothing, Kevin Marburg stated:

The band released several songs from the EP to various artists compilations for promotion. Remixed versions of "The Other Side" and "Kingpin" were released on the 1992 Assimilation compilation album by Metal Blade Records. Another remix of "Kingpin" titled "Exclusive Mix" was later released on the compilations Funky Alternatives Seven in 1993 and again a year later on Alternative Route '94. "The Other Side" was released on the Chambermade compilation by Re-Constriction Records in 1995 and later re-recorded for band's 1996 eponymously titled debut studio album Diatribe. Between the release of Nothing and the band's debut album they recorded a cover of Sugarcubes' "Coldsweat" for Shut Up Kitty: A Cyber-Based Covers Compilation by Re-Constriction Records, which was released in 1993.

Reception 
Fabryka Music Magazine gave the album three out of four possible stars and recommended the album for enthusiasts of early 90's industrial rock. Sonic Boom gave both Diatribe's debut release and Nothing a positive review, saying "Diatribe has at least as much talent as the rest of their label mates."

Track listing

Personnel
Adapted from the Nothing liner notes.

Diatribe
 Marc Jameson – lead vocals, keyboards, drums, programming, production (1-3), engineering (1-3), mixing (1, 3), recording (4)
 Kevin Marburg – bass guitar, sampler, cover art, design, production (1, 3), engineering (1, 3), mixing (1, 3)
 Vince Montalbano – electric guitar, production (1, 3), engineering (1, 3), mixing (1, 3)
 Pat Toves – electric guitar, production (1, 3), engineering (1, 3), mixing (1, 3)

Production and additional personnel
 Jonathan Burnside – editing, engineering
 Ken Lee – mastering
 Nivek Ogre – production (1, 3), engineering (1, 3), mixing (1, 3)
 Lee Popa – production (1, 3), engineering (1, 3), mixing (1, 3)
 Jeff Stuart Saltzman – mixing (2)

Release history

References

External links 
 

Diatribe (band) albums
1992 EPs
Re-Constriction Records EPs
Albums produced by Nivek Ogre